The Romanian Cyrillic alphabet is the Cyrillic alphabet that was used to write the Romanian language before the 1860s, when it was officially replaced by a Latin-based Romanian alphabet. Cyrillic remained in occasional use until the 1920s, mostly in Russian-ruled Bessarabia. 

From the 1830s until the full adoption of the Latin alphabet, the so-called Romanian transitional alphabet was in place, combining Cyrillic and Latin letters, and including some of the Latin letters with diacritics that remain in the modern Romanian alphabet. The Romanian Orthodox Church continued using the alphabet in its publications until 1881.

The Romanian Cyrillic alphabet is not the same as the Moldovan Cyrillic alphabet (which is based on the modern Russian alphabet) that was used in the Moldavian SSR for most of the Soviet era and that is still used in Transnistria.

Table of correspondence 

The Romanian Cyrillic alphabet was close to the contemporary version of the Early Cyrillic alphabet of the Old Church Slavonic liturgical language.

Unregulated transitional alphabets 
Starting with the 1830s and ending with the official adoption of the Latin alphabet, there were no regulations for writing Romanian, and various alphabets using Cyrillic and Latin letters, besides the mid-transitional version in the table above, were used, sometimes two or more of them in a single book. The following table shows some of the many alphabets used in print.

Example of Romanian Cyrillic text 

According to a document from the 1850s, this is how the Romanian Lord's Prayer looked in Cyrillic script. Transcriptional values correspond to the above table.

See also 

 Early Cyrillic alphabet
 Moldovan Cyrillic alphabet
 Romanian alphabet

References 

Cyrillic alphabets
History of the Romanian language
Romanian language
19th-century disestablishments in Romania
Writing systems introduced in the 16th century
1521 establishments in Europe
1520s establishments in Romania